The 156th Georgia General Assembly convened its first session on January 11, 2021, at the Georgia State Capitol in Atlanta.

The current membership of the General Assembly was elected in the 2020 State Senate and State House elections.

Party composition

Senate

House of Representatives

Members of the State Senate 
The following is a list of members of the Georgia State Senate.

Members of the House of Representatives
The following is a list of members of the Georgia House of Representatives.

Notes

References

Georgia (U.S. state) legislative sessions
2021 in Georgia (U.S. state)
Georgia